Judit Veszeli (born 3 March 1978 in Budapest) is a retired Hungarian team handball player, who was the top scorer of the Hungarian top division in the 2006–2007 season.

Achievements 

Nemzeti Bajnokság I:
Bronze Medalist: 1998
Magyar Kupa:
Bronze Medalist: 2003

Awards
 Nemzeti Bajnokság I Top Scorer: 2007

References

External links 
 Career statistics on Worldhandball.com

1978 births
Living people
Handball players from Budapest
Hungarian female handball players
Expatriate handball players
Hungarian expatriates in Denmark